Tradition Lives is a 2016 studio album by American country music singer Mark Chesnutt. It was released in 2016 on Row Entertainment.

Content
The album includes the track "There Won't Be Another Now", a cover of a Merle Haggard song from his 1985 album Kern River. Chesnutt had recorded the song several years prior and had not intended for it to be an album, but chose to include it because the album had been released shortly after Haggard's death.

Critical reception
Giving it 3.5 out of 5 stars, Stephen Thomas Erlewine of AllMusic wrote to "Throughout the album, Chesnutt keeps things simple, spare, and easy, keeping the focus on the song and the instrumental interplay -- the very things that make for great country, of which this is proudly part of that long tradition."

Track listing
"I've Got a Quarter in My Pocket" (Billy Yates, John Ludowitz) - 2:46	
"Is It Still Cheating" (Randy Houser, Jamey Johnson, Jerrod Niemann) - 3:50
"Lonely Ain't the Only Game in Town" (Don Poythress, Jimmy Ritchey, Donnie Skaggs) - 2:57
"Oughta Miss Me by Now" (Trey Mathews, Tony Ramey) - 3:35
"Neither Did I" (Monty Criswell, Tim Menzies, Ritchey) - 4:09
"So You Can't Hurt Me Anymore" (Roger Springer, William Michael Morgan, Ritchey) - 3:49
"You Moved Up in Your World" (Dale Dodson, Brett Eldredge, Curly Putman) - 3:24
"Look at Me Now" (Blaine Larsen, Poythress, Ritchey) - 4:14
"Losing You All Over Again" (Larsen, Poythress, Ritchet) - 3:52
"Never Been to Texas" (Chesnutt, Springer, Slugger Morrissette) - 3:16
"What I Heard" (Byron Hill, Cary Stone) - 3:16
"Hot" (Poythress, Wynn Varble) - 3:44		
"There Won't Be Another Now" (Red Lane) - 4:16

Personnel
Adapted from liner notes.

Eddie Bayers - drums
Jim "Moose" Brown - B-3 organ, piano
Mark Chesnutt - lead vocals
Larry Franklin - fiddle
Wes Hightower - background vocals
Mike Johnson - dobro, steel guitar
B. James Lowry - acoustic guitar
Brent Mason - electric guitar
Steve Nathan - B-3 organ, piano, synthesizer
Michael Rhodes - bass guitar
Jimmy Ritchey - acoustic guitar, electric guitar, tic-tac bass
Glenn Worf - bass guitar, upright bass

Chart performance

References

2016 albums
Mark Chesnutt albums
Albums produced by Jimmy Ritchey